Nugzar Lobzhanidze (born 7 September 1971) is a retired Georgian professional football player.

1971 births
Living people
Soviet footballers
Footballers from Georgia (country)
Expatriate footballers from Georgia (country)
Russian Premier League players
Expatriate footballers in Russia
Expatriate footballers in Greece
FC Dinamo Tbilisi players
PFC CSKA Moscow players
Xanthi F.C. players
Erovnuli Liga players
Georgia (country) international footballers
Association football defenders